Jon Ander Insausti Irastorza (born 13 December 1992 in Mutiloa) is a Spanish former professional road cyclist.

Major results

Cyclo-cross

2009–2010
 1st  Junior race, National Championships
2010–2011
 1st  Under-23 race, National Championships

Road

2012
 1st Time trial, Basque Country Under-23 Road Championships
2013
 1st Time trial, Basque Country Road Championships
2014
 1st Time trial, Basque Country Under-23 Road Championships
2015
 2nd Cholet-Pays de Loire
2017
 1st Stage 8 Tour of Japan

References

External links

1992 births
Living people
Spanish male cyclists
Cyclists from the Basque Country (autonomous community)
People from Goierri
Sportspeople from Gipuzkoa